Daniella Pineda (born February 20, 1987) is an American actress. She has had major roles in several films and TV series, including The Originals, Netflix's live-action Cowboy Bebop, and multiple films in the Jurassic Park franchise. She began her career through online comedy and fashion videos, with her first movie role in 2011. She later appeared in the backdoor pilot of The Originals and several episodes of the show's first season. Her first role in a movie produced by a major studio was in 2018, with Jurassic World: Fallen Kingdom. As a Mexican American, she has spoken out about the difficulties Mexican actors face.

Early life
Daniella Pineda was born on February 20, 1987, in Oakland, California, the daughter of Eric Klein and Patricia Pineda. Daniella has two siblings, Anneliese and Elliot. She is a third-generation Mexican American on her mother’s side, and both of her adoptive parents are Mexican. She graduated from Mills College with a sociology and radio journalism degree. She acquired a fellowship at KALW, where topics she discussed included racism and poverty in the Bay Area.

Career
Pineda's first acting role was in a 2010 episode of Men of a Certain Age, although she created a larger image online; she appeared in several CollegeHumor comedy sketch videos between 2010 and 2011, as well as fashion tutorials on YouTube. Her first appearance in film was the 2011 comedy drama Newlyweds, directed by Edward Burns. It received mostly positive reviews from critics.

Pineda later appeared in an episode of The CW's The Vampire Diaries, which functioned as a backdoor pilot for the spin-off series The Originals, which began airing in 2013. In February of 2014, her character, the witch Sophie Deveraux, was killed off in the 13th episode, eliminating Pineda from the cast. Executive producer Julie Plec later revealed that the character's death was not initially planned but considered suitable for her actions in the series.

In 2015, Pineda starred in NBC's American Odyssey (first announced the previous year as Odyssey), which follows a team of American soldiers trying to expose a conspiracy. She played a character named Ruby Simms. The show was cancelled after one season.

In October 2017, Pineda had a role in Mr. Roosevelt, a comedy directed by Noël Wells. It was a critical success, receiving a full 100% on Rotten Tomatoes from 34 reviews.

In July 2018, Pineda played Zia Rodriguez in Jurassic World: Fallen Kingdom, her first time appearing in a movie created by a major studio. Rodriguez, a veterinarian, is part of a mission to rescue dinosaurs from a volcanic eruption. Pineda commented on how realistic the dinosaurs in the movie were, with pulsing veins and dilating eyes. In another interview, she explained how her character was originally going to have a conversation with Owen Grady (Chris Pratt), in which the former revealed herself to be lesbian, although this dialogue was cut from the final product. Pineda explained that this decision was made for time reasons.

In 2019, Pineda starred in the horror film Mercy Black as Marina Hess, a woman who was institutionalized for fifteen years after partaking in a ritual to appease the entity "Mercy Black", now finally convinced that the creature was not real, allowing her to go live with her family. In May of the same year, Pineda portrayed Cassidy in the Netflix neo-noir series What/If. The show has one ten-episode season to date.

By April 2019, Pineda had been cast as Faye Valentine in a live-action version of the Cowboy Bebop series. It released in 2021. Pineda described her character, who is ethnically Singaporean-Romani, as "a smart-ass" and "fun". Unlike in the original anime, the series' version of the character is LGBT.

In August 2021, Pineda was cast in Plane, starring Gerard Butler in the lead.

In 2022, she reprised her role as Zia Rodriguez in Jurassic World Dominion. Rodriguez appeared in the opening; however, travel restrictions and quarantine requirements due to the COVID-19 pandemic prevented Pineda, who was in New Zealand, from showing up in another planned scene. She was replaced in her second scene with Varada Sethu. Director Colin Trevorrow was satisfied with the change. Later the same year, Pineda was cast as Bess, the proprietress of a saloon in the comedy pilot Western.

Personal life and activism
Pineda was adopted by her aunt and uncle at age 16, and her biological parents are "not really in the picture", according to her.

She has pushed for greater recognition of Mexican actors, saying that they are "often relegated to obscurity" in scripts and casting, and that Latin America is underrepresented overall. She has also complained about being told by casting directors that she does not look or seem Mexican enough, despite being of Mexican heritage.

Filmography

Film

Television

References

External links
 

American film actresses
American television actresses
American women comedians
Actresses from Oakland, California
Living people
Mills College alumni
American actresses of Mexican descent
Writers from Oakland, California
1987 births
Comedians from California
21st-century American comedians
21st-century American actresses